Leallah (foaled February 7, 1954 in Kentucky) was an American Thoroughbred racehorse won seven of her eight starts in her first year of racing and was voted the 1956 American Champion Two-Year-Old Filly by Daily Racing Form and Turf & Sports Digest.

Racing career

1956: two-year-old season
Leallah was conditioned for racing by future U.S. Racing Hall of Fame inductee
MacKenzie Miller. She made her racing debut on June 12, 1956 with a win under Eddie Arcaro at Belmont Park in Elmont, New York. She and Arcaro won another non-stakes race a week later on the same track then was sent to Monmouth Park Racetrack in Oceanport, New Jersey where she equaled the track record for five furlongs with a time of one minute, four seconds flat in easily winning the Colleen Stakes. After winning the July 7th Lassie Stakes under Bill Hartack at Chicago's Arlington Park, Leallah then came back to Long Island, New York and won the Astoria Stakes at Jamaica Race Course. Reporting on the race, the July 19, 1956 edition of the New York Times wrote that "Leallah's reputation as the "wonder filly" of the season grew at the Jamaica race track yesterday."

On August 14, 1956, on a very muddy track for the Princess Pat Stakes at Washington Park Racetrack in Chicago, Leallah lost for the first and only time during her two-year-old season when she slogged home fourth to winner, Splendored. Leallah was scheduled to run in late August in the Spinaway Stakes at Saratoga Race Course but after heavy rains resulted in a sloppy track her trainer made the decision not to run. She then won a non-stakes sprint at Belmont Park in late September before closing out her 1956 campaign with her seventh win in the October 13th Alcibiades Stakes at Keeneland Race Course in Lexington, Kentucky.

Leallah was voted the Champion two-year-old filly by the New York Morning Telegraph / Daily Racing Form and the Turf and Sport Digest. The rival Thoroughbred Racing Association award was won by Romanita.

1957: three-year-old season
Although at age three in 1957 Leallah did not match her 1956 performances, during the latter part of the year she returned to top form. On October 10 she set a new track record at Keeneland Race Course of 1:09 flat for six furlongs on dirt. and on November 3 she won the important Falls City Handicap at Churchill Downs.

Broodmare
Leallah's impeccable breeding and on-track performances made her a very valuable broodmare. She was retired after her three-year-old campaign to stand at her olwners Marchmont Farm on Winchester Road near Paris, Kentucky. Bred to important stallions such as Round Table, Swaps, Sir Ivor, Vaguely Noble, Herbager, her best foal to race was Go Marching by Princequillo who was sold to Warner L. Jones, Jr. as an unnamed two-year-old colt in a May 1967 Fasig-Tipton sale at Belmont Park for a record $210,000.
She  had Bradomin a dark brown unraced  colt by Ribot, in 1969, who was leading broodmare sire in Mexico, and sire of Victorioso who was leading sire in Mexico several years .Bradomin by Ribot was the second highest  price at Saratoga sale 1970 his buyer Raul Cano. His price was 200,000 dls.

Pedigree

References

 Leallah's pedigree

1954 racehorse births
1976 racehorse deaths
Racehorses bred in Kentucky
Racehorses trained in the United States
American Champion racehorses
Thoroughbred family 16-g